Hindustan Unilever Limited (HUL) is a British-owned Indian consumer goods company headquartered in  Mumbai. It is a subsidiary of the British company Unilever. Its products include foods, beverages, cleaning agents, personal care products, water purifiers and other fast-moving consumer goods (FMCGs).

HUL was established in 1931 as Hindustan Vanaspati Manufacturing Co. Following a merger of constituent groups in 1956, it was renamed Hindustan Lever Limited. The company was renamed again in June 2007 as Hindustan Unilever Limited.

Hindustan Unilever has been at the helm of a lot of controversies, such as dumping highly toxic mercury-contaminated waste in regular dumps, contaminating the land and water of Kodaikanal. (See: Kodaikanal mercury poisoning). The British company also faced major flak for an advertising campaign attacking the Hindu pilgrimage site at Kumbh Mela, calling it a "place where old people get abandoned," a move that was termed racist and insensitive.

As of 2019, Hindustan Unilever's portfolio had 50+ product brands in 14 categories. The company has 21,000 employees and clocked sales of ₹34,619 crores in FY2017–18.

In December 2018, HUL announced its acquisition of GlaxoSmithKline's India's consumer business for $3.8 billion in an all equity merger deal with a 1:4.39 ratio. However the integration of GSK's 3,800 employees remained uncertain as HUL stated there was no clause for retention of employees in the deal. In April 2020, HUL completed its merger with GlaxoSmithKline Consumer Healthcare (GSKCH India) after completing all legal procedures. In December 2022, HUL's market cap was Rs. 638548.42 crore.

Headquarters

Hindustan Unilever's corporate headquarters are located in Andheri, Mumbai. The campus is spread over 12.5 acres of land and houses over 1,600 employees. Some of the facilities available for the employees include a convenience store, a food court, an occupational health centre, a gym, a sports & recreation centre and a day care centre. The Campus is designed by Mumbai-based architecture firm Kapadia Associates.

The campus received a certification from LEED (Leadership in Energy and Environmental Design) Gold in the 'New Construction' category, by Indian Green Building Council (IGBC), Hyderabad, under licence from the United States Green Building Council (USGBC)

The company's previous headquarters were located in Backbay Reclamation, Mumbai at the Lever House, where it was housed for more than 46 years.

Research facilities

The Hindustan Unilever Research Centre (HURC) was set up in 1966 in Mumbai, and Unilever Research India in Bangalore in 1997. In 2006, the company's research facilities were brought together at a single site in Bangalore.

Sustainable living

Unilever launched Sustainable Living Plan on 15 November 2010 in London, Rotterdam, New York and New Delhi simultaneously.

Brands and products 
HUL is the market leader in Indian consumer products with presence in over 20 consumer categories such as soaps, tea, detergents and shampoos amongst others with over 700 million Indian consumers using its products. Sixteen of HUL's brands featured in the ACNielsen Brand Equity list of 100 Most Trusted Brands Annual Survey (2014), carried out by Brand Equity, a supplement of The Economic Times.

Food 

 Annapurna salt and Atta (formerly known as Kissan Annapurna)
 Bru coffee
 Brooke Bond (3 Roses, Taj Mahal, Taaza, Red Label) tea
 Kissan squashes, ketchups, juices and jams
 Lipton ice tea
 Knorr soups & meal makers and soupy noodles
 Kwality Wall's frozen dessert
 Hellmann's mayonnaise
 Magnum (ice cream)
 Cornetto Ice cream cone 
Horlicks (Health Drink)

Homecare 

  Active Wheel detergent
 Cif Cream Cleaner
 Comfort fabric softeners
 Domex disinfectant/toilet cleaner
 Nature Protect disinfectant surface cleaner
 Rin detergents and bleach
 Sunlight detergent and colour care
 Surf Excel detergent and gentle wash
 Vim dishwash
 Magic – Water Saver

Source:

Personal care 

 Aviance Beauty Solutions
 Axe deodorant, aftershave lotion and soap
 LEVER Ayush Therapy ayurvedic health care and personal care products
 International breeze
 Brylcreem hair cream and hair gel
 Clear anti-dandruff hair products
 Clinic Plus shampoo and oil
 Close Up toothpaste
 Dove skin cleansing & hair care range: bar, lotions, creams and anti-perspirant deodorants
 Denim shaving products
 Glow and Lovely, skin lightening cream
 Hamam
 Indulekha
 Lakmé beauty products and salons
 Lifebuoy soaps and handwash range
 Liril 2000 soap
 Lux soap, body wash and deodorant
 Pears soap, body wash
 Pepsodent toothpaste
 Pond's talcs and creams
 Rexona
 Sunsilk shampoo 
 Sure anti-perspirant
 Vaseline petroleum jelly, skincare lotions
 TRESemmé
 TIGI

Source:

Water purifier 
  Pureit

Controversies

Mercury pollution 

In 2001 a thermometer factory in Kodaikanal run by Hindustan Unilever dumped glass contaminated with mercury in Prof. (Dr.) C. Raj Kumar, and selling it on to scrap merchants unable to deal with it appropriately. Protests by local NGOs and Greenpeace lead to the shutting of the factory in March 2001. After protest by activists led by Deepak Malghan of the Indian Institute of Management Bangalore Hindustan Unilever admitted before court to being guilty in the case in 2010.

Skin lightening creams 

Hindustan Unilever's "Glow & Lovely" is the leading skin-lightening cream for women in India. The company had to cease television advertisements for the product in 2007. Advertisements depicted depressed, dark-complexioned women, who had been ignored by employers and men, suddenly finding new boyfriends and glamorous careers after the cream had lightened their skin. In 2008, Hindustan Unilever made former Miss World Priyanka Chopra a brand ambassador for Pond's, and she then appeared in a mini-series of television commercials for another skin lightening product, 'White Beauty', alongside Saif Ali Khan and Neha Dhupia; these advertisements, showing Priyanka's face with a clearly darker complexion against the visibly fairer Neha Dhupia, were widely criticised for perpetuating racism and lowering the self-esteem of women and girls throughout India who were misled by HUL to believe that they needed to be white to be beautiful. The company rebranded the cream from Fair and Lovely to Glow and Lovely, removing the word Fair from the brand.

Triclosan 
Several academic papers have pointed out the firm's continued use of the antibacterial agent Triclosan ('Active B') in India because it is under review by the American Food and Drug Administration (US FDA).

Kumbh Mela ad 
In March 2019, HUL's advertisement for its beverage Brooke Bond Red Label tea was criticised on social media. A company tweet referred to the Kumbh Mela as a place where elderly people get abandoned by their family members. This resulted in a severe backlash in the form of an adverse hashtag trending on Twitter '#BoycottHindustanUnilever'.

Awards 

The Institute of Competitiveness, India, has recognized Hindustan Unilever Limited's Project Shakti for ‘Creating Shared Value’ and bestowed upon the company the Porter Prize for 2014. It ranked number one on the Forbes list of ‘Most Innovative Companies’ across the globe for 2014 and was ranked number three on Fortune India's list of India's most admired companies in a list compiled with the help of a global management consultancy Hay Group. It received an award from Dun & Bradstreet Corporate Awards in 2014. and was Client of the Year at Effies 2013 – 2014. It also received an award as a 'Conscious Capitalist of the Year' at the 2013 Forbes India Leadership Awards. HUL won 12 awards overall with 4 Golds, 4 Silvers and 4 Bronzes at the 2013 Emvies Awards. In 2013, HUL ranked number two on the on Fortune India's 2013 '50 Most Admired Companies list'. and was declared the fourth most Respected Company in India in a survey conducted by Business World in 2013.

As per a 2015 Nielsen Campus Track-business school survey, Hindustan Unilever emerged among the top employers of choice for B-school students graduating that year. It has often been called a 'Dream Employer' for application by B-School students in India.

In 2012, HUL was recognised as one of the world's most innovative companies by Forbes. With a ranking of number 6, it was the highest ranked FMCG company. Hindustan Unilever Limited (HUL) won the first prize at FICCI Water Awards 2012 under the category of 'community initiatives by industry' for Gundar Basin Project, a water conservationist initiative. Hindustan Unilever Limited won 13 awards at the Emvies 2012 Media Awards organised by the Advertising Club Bombay in September 2012.

The company received four awards at the Spikes Asia Awards 2012, held in September. The awards included one Grand Prix one Gold Award and two Silver Awards.

HUL's Chhindwara Unit won the National Safety Award for outstanding performance in Industrial Safety. These awards were instituted by the Union Ministry of Labour and Employment in 1965.

HUL was one of the eight Indian companies to be featured on the Forbes list of World's Most Reputed companies in 2007.

In July 2012, Hindustan Unilever Limited won the Golden Peacock Occupational Health and Safety Award for 2012 in the FMCG category for its safety and health initiatives and continuous improvement on key metrics.

Hindustan Unilever Limited is rated as best 3Ci Company which is registered with National Industrial Classification Code 15140.

Pond's Talcum Powder's packaging innovation has secured a Silver Award at the prestigious 24th DuPont Global Packaging Award, in May 2012. The brand was recognized for cost and waste reduction.

In May 2012, HUL & Star Bazaar received the silver award for 'Creating Consumer Value through Joint Promotional and Event Forecasting' at the 13th ECR Efficient Consumer Response Asia Pacific Conference.

In 2011, HUL was named the most innovative company in India by Forbes and ranked 6th in the top 10 list of most innovative companies in the world.

Hindustan Unilever Ltd received the National Award for Excellence in Corporate Governance 2011 of the Institute of Company Secretaries of India (ICSI) for excellence in corporate governance.

In 2012, Hindustan Unilever emerged as the No. 1 employer of choice for B-School students who will graduate in 2012. In addition, HUL also retained the 'Dream Employer' status for the 3rd year running.

Hindustan Unilever ranked No. 2 in Fortune India's Most Admired Companies list, which was released by Fortune India in partnership with the Hay Group. The company received the highest scores for endurance and financial soundness.

HUL was ranked 47th in The Brand Trust Report 2014 published by Trust Research Advisory. 36 HUL brands also featured in the list including Lux, Dove, Lipton, Vim, Kissan, Bru, Rexona, Close Up, Clinic Plus, Pond's, Knorr, and Pepsodent among others.

HUL emerged as the top 'Dream Employer' as well as the top company considered for application in the annual B-School Survey conducted by Nielsen in November 2010. This was the second successive year that HUL has been rated as the top 'Dream Employer' in India. HUL has also emerged as the top employer of choice among the top six Indian Institutes of Management (IIMA, B, C, L, K and I).

HUL won three awards at the 'CNBC Awaaz Storyboard Consumer Awards' in 2011 – Most Recommended FMCG Company of the Year; Most Consumer Conscious Company of the Year and Digital Marketer of the Year.

The company was felicitated in April 2010 for receiving the highest number of patents in the year 2009 at Annual Intellectual Property Awards 2010.

In 2007, Hindustan Unilever was rated as the most respected company in India for the past 25 years by Businessworld, one of India's leading business magazines. The rating was based on a compilation of the magazine's annual survey of India's most reputed companies over the past 25 years.

HUL is one of the country's largest exporters; it has been recognised as a Golden Super Star Trading House by the Government of India.

See also
 Brooke Bond Taj Mahal Tea House, Hindustan Unilever's first tea house restaurant
 Dalda, vegetable cooking oil brand started by HUL

References

External links

To buy HUL pureit water purifier

Manufacturing companies based in Mumbai
Food and drink companies of India
Unilever companies
BSE SENSEX
NIFTY 50
Manufacturing companies established in 1933
Indian subsidiaries of foreign companies
Multi-level marketing companies
Indian companies established in 1933
Companies listed on the National Stock Exchange of India
Companies listed on the Bombay Stock Exchange